Sad Movie is a 2005 South Korean romantic melodrama film with an ensemble cast. The film was released in South Korean theaters on October 20, 2005, and had a total of 1,066,765 admissions nationwide.

Plot
The film comprises four separate storylines.

Jin-woo is a firefighter who buys a ring for his girlfriend. Her name is Soo-jung, and she works at a TV station as a news translator for the deaf. She is waiting for him to propose, with the rationale that given his dangerous job, she likes the idea of him having to think of her, to hesitate for a while before jumping into danger. He, on the other hand, is waiting for that perfect opportunity and setting, before popping the question.

Suk-hyun tells her unemployed boyfriend Ha-seok that she needs a more stable guy who has a good job. So Ha-seok goes off and finds himself a job helping other couples break up.

Ju-young is a mother is too busy to spend time with her young son Hee-chan, until an illness confines her to a hospital bed. There the mother and son begin to communicate more and more.

Soo-eun is a deaf girl who works as a costumed character mascot in a theme park. There she meets a young artist who she quickly begins to develop feelings for, yet she refuses to take off her mask in front of him because of her scar.

Cast
Jung Woo-sung as Lee Jin-woo
Im Soo-jung as Ahn Soo-jung
Cha Tae-hyun as Jung Ha-seok
Son Tae-young as Choi Suk-hyun
Yum Jung-ah as Yeom Ju-young
Yeo Jin-goo as Park Hee-chan
Shin Min-a as Ahn Soo-eun
Lee Ki-woo as Sang-gyu

References

External links 
 
 
 

2005 films
South Korean romantic drama films
2000s South Korean films